Surti indicates relationship with the city of Surat in India. It may refer to:
 A member of the Gujarati people resembling a stereotypical resident of Surat in the state of Gujarat, India
 A dialect of the Gujarati language spoken in and around Surat
Surti buffalo, a type of water buffalo from Gujarat
Surati goat, breed of goat from Surat
Surti paneer, paneer (curd cheese) from Surat
Surti Kistaiya, Indian politician from Madhya Pradesh
Abid Surti, Indian cartoonist and writer from Surat
Mehul Surti, Indian musician from Surat
Mohammed Surti, Indian National Congress politician from Surat
Rusi Surti, Indian cricketer from Surat

See also 

 Surat (disambiguation)
 Syrtis (disambiguation)

Culture of Surat

it:Gujarati